Proatheris (commonly referred to as the lowland viper and swamp viper among other names) is a monotypic genus created for the viper species, Proatheris superciliaris. This is a small terrestrial species endemic to East Africa. Like all other vipers, it is venomous. No subspecies are currently recognized.

Description
The females are slightly larger than the males. The head has a somewhat elongated appearance, the top of which is covered with small scales except for a pair of large supraocular scales, which are almost twice as long as they are wide.

Common names
Common names for the Proatheris include the lowland viper, swamp viper, lowland swamp viper, eyebrow viper, swamp adder, Peter's viper, flood-plain viper, Mozambique viper, African lowland viper, and the domino viper.

Geographic range
It is found in East Africa. The southern part of its range begins near Beira, in central Mozambique, extends up north over the Mozambique Plain to Quissanga, and through Malawi and as far north as the floodplains of southern Tanzania at the northern end of Lake Malawi.

The type locality given is "Terra Querimba" (= Quissanga mainland opposite Ilha Quirimba, Mozambique).

Its range is apparently centered on the lower section of the Zambezi River and spreads out into the coastal plain of central Mozambique and the Shire Valley to Lake Chilwa and Malawi. However, other specimens have been found far from this region, such as in Cape Delgado Province, in north-eastern Mozambique, and Mwaya in south-western Tanzania.

Habitat
It is almost always found in low-lying marshes, floodplains and land frequently used for grazing cattle. The soil is never too dry, since this would make it difficult for the rodents that they feed on to dig their burrows. These snakes are entirely terrestrial and are usually found in or around these rodent burrows.

Behaviour
One of the distinguishing characteristics of the Atheris group (to which Proatheris is closely related), is that they have prehensile tails. With Proatheris, the young and subadults have this capability, but it is diminished in the adults.

Feeding
Preys mainly on small frogs and toads. Occasionally, it also feeds on small rodents.

Reproduction
This species is viviparous, with typically 3-16 neonates.

Venom
The first known case of a survivor of snakebite by this species was reported by Els (1988), involving a  juvenile and 24-year-old victim penetrated by a single fang. The results were painful, but there were none of the strongly hemotoxic symptoms that had been associated with Atheris venom up to that point.

In a second case in 1996, a victim experienced severe hemolysis and complete platelet destruction after which his liver and kidneys began to fail. When it was feared that the patient might die from hemolytic-uremic syndrome, plasmapheresis was performed. Luckily, the patient survived, but it is now obvious that P. superciliaris venom is very hemotoxic.

Taxonomy
This species was previously placed in the genus Atheris based on skull characteristics and because of its partially prehensile tail.

Etymology
The generic name, Proatheris, is Latin for "before-atheris".

References

Further reading

Boulenger, G.A. 1896. Catalogue of the Snakes in the British Museum (Natural History). Volume III., Containing the ... Viperidæ. London: Trustees of the British Museum (Natural History). (Taylor and Francis, printers). xiv + 727 pp. + Plates I.- XXV. (Vipera superciliaris, p. 491).
Branch, Bill. 2004. Field Guide to Snakes and Other Reptiles of Southern Africa. Third Revised edition, Second impression. Sanibel Island, Florida: Ralph Curtis Books. 399 pp. . (Genus Proatheris, p. 119;  Proatheris superciliaris, pp. 119–120 + Plate 14).
Broadley, D.G. 1996. A review of the tribe Atherini (Serpentes: Viperidae), with descriptions of two new genera. African Journal of Herpetology 45: 40-48. (Genus Proatheris).
Els R. 1988. Atheris superciliaris envenomation. J. Herpetol. Assoc. Africa 34: 52.
Marais J. 1992. A Complete Guide to the Snakes of Southern Africa. Malabar, Florida: Krieger Publishing. 248 pp.
Marx H., Rabb G.B. 1965. Phyletic analysis of fifty characters of advanced snakes. Field Zool. 63: 1-321.
Peters, W. 1854. Diagnosen neuer Batrachier, welche zusammen mit der früher (24. Juli und 17. August) gegebenen Übersicht der Schlangen und Eidechsen mitgelheilt werden. Bericht über die zur Bekanntmachung geeigheten Verhandlugen der Königl. Preuss. Akademie der Wissenschaften zu Berlin 1854: 614-628. (Vipera superciliaris, p. 625).
Stevens RA. 1973. A report on the lowland viper, Atheris superciliaris from the Lake Chilwa floodplain of Malawi. Arnoldia (Rhodesia) 22: 1-22.

External links

Viperinae
Monotypic snake genera
Reptiles described in 1854